Bowzeh (also Romanized as Bowzeh) is a village in Akhtachi-ye Gharbi Rural District, in the Central District of Mahabad County, West Azerbaijan Province, Iran. At the 2006 census, its population was 177, in 30 families.

References 

Populated places in Mahabad County